Archibald Acheson 1st Viscount Gosford PC (Ire) (1 September 1718 – 5 September 1790), known as Sir Achibald Acheson, 6th Bt from 1748 to 1776, was an Irish peer and politician.

Life
The son of Sir Arthur Acheson, 5th Baronet, he succeeded to the baronetcy upon the death of his father, and was subsequently created Baron Gosford in 1776 and Viscount Gosford in 1785. Acheson entered the Irish House of Commons for Dublin University in 1741 and was a Member of Parliament for it until 1761. Subsequently, he represented Armagh County until 1776. In 1768, he was also elected for Killyleagh, but chose to sit for the latter constituency. Between 1776 and 1777, he was returned for Enniskillen. He was appointed High Sheriff of Armagh in 1751 and High Sheriff of Cavan in 1761. Between 1756 and 1761, he was Deputy Governor of County Armagh and on 7 May he was sworn of the Privy Council of Ireland.

Family
He married Mary Richardson in 1740, with whom he had the following children:
Hon Nichola Acheson
Arthur Acheson, 1st Earl of Gosford (c. 1742–1807)

He was the father of Hon. Anna Maria Acheson, whose mother is not mentioned.

References

thePeerage.com

1718 births
1790 deaths
High Sheriffs of Armagh
Acheson, Archibald
Acheson, Archibald
Acheson, Archibald
Acheson, Archibald
Members of the Privy Council of Ireland
Viscounts in the Peerage of Ireland
Peers of Ireland created by George III
High Sheriffs of Cavan
Members of the Parliament of Ireland (pre-1801) for County Down constituencies
Members of the Parliament of Ireland (pre-1801) for County Fermanagh constituencies
Members of the Parliament of Ireland (pre-1801) for Dublin University
Members of the Parliament of Ireland (pre-1801) for County Armagh constituencies